Synlestes is a genus of damselflies in the family Synlestidae.
Species of Synlestes are very large damselflies, metallic green to dark bronze or black in colour with white, yellow or orange markings.
Unlike many other damselflies, they spread their wings when resting. They are endemic to eastern Australia where they inhabit streams.

Species 
The genus Synlestes includes the following species:

Synlestes selysi  - forest needle
Synlestes tropicus   - tropical needle
Synlestes weyersii   - bronze needle

References

Synlestidae
Zygoptera genera
Odonata of Australia
Endemic fauna of Australia
Taxa named by Edmond de Sélys Longchamps
Damselflies